Isopsestis cuprina is a moth in the family Drepanidae. It was described by Frederic Moore in 1881. It is found in Tibet, India and Nepal.

The forewings are pale metallic brown, slightly cupreous anteriorly and the area below the cell is greenish. There are two or three black transverse antemedian lines angled at the median vein and some basal spots, a black discocellular recurved mark and a spot within the cell. There are five or six transverse discal indistinct sinuous lines with black and white dentate marks on the veins, as well as a submarginal pale lunular line and a marginal black line. The hindwings are pale cupreous white, with a pale cupreous-brown marginal band.

References

Moths described in 1881
Thyatirinae